Arisa is the debut studio album by Japanese recording artist Arisa Mizuki, released through Nippon Columbia on December 4, 1991. Arisa is predominantly a pop music album. It is written by an array of famous Japanese musicians, including Amii Ozaki, Princess Princess vocalist Kaori Okui, Takeshi Kobayashi, Tetsuya Komuro, and The Alfee guitarist Toshihiko Takamizawa. In its review of the album, CDJournal described Arisa as an "idol record" that can appeal to actual music lovers. The online magazine praised Mizuki's vocal ability for being "far greater than the typical teenager" and noted that the only apparent flaw was the album's lack of cohesion.

The album spawned three singles, "Densetsu no Shōjo," "Eden no Machi," and "Kaze no Naka de," all of which were top ten hits. The original version of "Densetsu no Shōjo" is not featured on the album, instead an extended album version was included. Arisa debuted at number 8 on the Oricon Weekly Albums chart, selling 49,950 copies in its first week.

The official title of track six is "Cherry Cherry ♥ Strawberry," with the black heart mark. The official pronunciation for the title of track ten, "" ("moon" in Japanese), which is habitually romanized as "Tsuki," is "Luna".

Commercial performance 
Arisa debuted on the Oricon Weekly Albums chart at number 8 with 49,950 copies sold in its first week. It spent a second week in the top twenty at number 20 with 20,990 copies sold. The album charted for eight weeks and has sold a total of 123,980 copies.

Track listing

Charts and sales

References 

1991 albums
Alisa Mizuki albums
Nippon Columbia albums
Japanese-language albums